Mardaman (modern Bassetki) was a northern Mesopotamian city that existed between ca.2200 and 1200 BC. It was uncovered in 2018 after translation of 92 cuneiform tablets. The tablets were discovered in summer 2017, near the Kurdish village of Bassetki, by a team of archaeologists. The team hailed from Tübingen's Institute for Ancient Near Eastern Studies, and were led by Prof. Dr. Peter Pfälzner of the University of Tübingen.

History

The city was continuously occupied between 3000 and 600 BC.

Early Bronze
The earliest reference dates to the reign of Naram-Sin of Akkad. The city joined under its ruler Duhsusu in the "Great Revolt" against the third Akkadian king. The city was destroyed, but was later rebuilt and is mentioned by sources from the Third Dynasty of Ur in around 2100 -2000 BC as an important city on Mesopotamia's northern border.

Middle Bronze
The city was then the center of a kingdom, and was captured by Shamshi-Adad I in 1786.

After his fall, the city became an independent kingdom under the Hurrian ruler Tish-ulme. A never dispatched letter, meant to have been sent to Tishe-ulme from Zimri-Lim, requested that he hand over the city to Zimri-Lim, who would give it to a local ruler loyal to him. The relations with Mari seem to have been hostile, also seen in Mardaman's support for Hadnum. The latter changed its alliance from Zimri-Lim to the city of Kurda. Haqba-Hammu, the ruler of Karana and ally of Mari, invaded Hadnum in retaliation, with 2,000 men. Even relief forces from Mardama could not prevent the capturing of five cities of Hadnum. Another letter in the Mari archives informed Zimri-Lim of the conquest of Mardaman by his allies Quarni-Lim of Andarig and Sharraya of northern Razama. Mardaman suffered another sacking by the Turukkaeans, a mountain people from the Zagros Mountains to the north, around 1769/1768.

Late Bronze
During the Middle Assyrian Empire, the city had a final period of prosperity as a governor's seat between 1250 and 1200 BC. Clay tablets indicate the name of the governor, Assur-nasir and list some of his activities.

Archaeology

The ruins of a Bronze Age city in Bassetki were discovered in 2013 during a field search by the University of Tübingen. Since 2016 excavations, led by Prof. Dr. Peter Pfälzner and Dr. Hasan Qasim of the archaeological department in Duhok, have been conducted at the site. Excavation continued in 2018 and 2019.

In 2016, it was discovered that the city had a wall from c. 2700 BC protecting the upper city and an extensive road network, several residential districts and a palatial building. A temple dedicated to Adad, a Mesopotamian weather god, evidently existed there. In summer 2017, the archaeologists excavated 92 tablets dating to the Middle Assyrian Empire, about 1,250 BC in a ceramic vessel that was protected by a thick layer of clay, possibly for storing of the included tablets. The small, partially broken tablets were deciphered by Dr. Betina Faist, who identified Mardaman.

See also
 Cities of the Ancient Near East
 Bassetki Statue
 Shuwala

References

External links
 Video about the current excavations - Aug 18, 2020
 On the Fringe of Mesopotamia - Peter Pfalzner Oriental Institute lecture on the excavations at Bassketi

Archaeological sites in Iraq
Ancient Assyrian cities
Former populated places in Iraq